Humberto Armando Prieto Herrera (born 6 August 1985) is a Mexican politician affiliated with the PAN. As of 2013 he served as Deputy of the LXII Legislature of the Mexican Congress representing Tamaulipas.

References

1985 births
Living people
People from Hermosillo
Politicians from Sonora
National Action Party (Mexico) politicians
21st-century Mexican politicians
Monterrey Institute of Technology and Higher Education alumni
Deputies of the LXII Legislature of Mexico
Members of the Chamber of Deputies (Mexico) for Tamaulipas